Spatacsin is a protein that in humans is encoded by the SPG11 gene.

Function 
Spatacsin, in combination with the SPG15 protein, attaches the AP5 adaptor complex to the outside of late Endosomes or Lysosomes when the protein via which it binds is in a particular state.

Pathology 
Mutations of the SPG11 gene cause a rare form of spastic paraplegia, spastic paraplegia type 11.

References

Further reading

External links 
  GeneReviews/NCBI/NIH/UW entry on Spastic Paraplegia Type 11 SPG11-Related Hereditary Spastic Paraplegia with Thin Corpus Callosum